The following is a list of Singaporean electoral divisions from 1988 to 1991 that served as constituencies that elected Members of Parliament (MPs) to the 7th Parliament of Singapore in the 1988 Singaporean general elections. The number of seats in Parliament had increased by 2 to 81 seats.

On 1 June 1988, the group representative constituency (GRC) scheme was introduced, in which teams of 3 or 4 candidates from a constituency compete to be elected into Parliament. This resulted in a reduced number of constituencies from the previous general election. The aim of the GRC scheme was to allow minorities to be elected and represented in Parliament. It was later amended to teams of 4 to 6 candidates in the 1997 general elections.

Group Representation Constituencies

Single Member Constituencies

References

External links 
 

1988